Acanthus the Lacedaemonian, was the victor in two footrace events, the diaulos and dolichos, in the Olympic Games of 720 BC. He was also, according to some accounts, the first who ran naked in these games. Other accounts ascribe this to Orsippus the Megarian. Thucydides says that the Lacedaemonians were the first who contended naked in gymnastic games, although he does not mention Acanthus by name.

References

Sources 
 

8th-century BC Spartans
Ancient Spartan athletes
Ancient Olympic competitors